Kaposhomok is a village in Somogy county, Hungary.

The settlement is part of the Balatonboglár wine region.

External links 
 Street map (Hungarian)

References 

Populated places in Somogy County
Hungarian German communities in Somogy County